Velp is a railway station located in Velp, Netherlands. The station was opened in 1865 and is located on the Arnhem–Leeuwarden railway. The train services are operated by Nederlandse Spoorwegen.

Train services

Bus services

External links
NS website 
Dutch Public Transport journey planner 

Railway stations in Gelderland
Railway stations opened in 1865
Rheden